Até que a Sbórnia nos Separe  (Portuguese for Til Sbornia Do Us Part) is a 2013 Brazilian adult animated dark comedy film directed by Otto Guerra and Ennio Torresan Jr, based on the play "Tangos & Tragédias", presented on stage since 1984. The creators of the play, Nico Nicolaiewsky and Hique Gomez, are credited for the voice of some characters and the movie soundtrack.

The film follows the consequences of the accidental fall of the wall that separates a small country called Sbórnia from the rest of the world, and the culture shock that the protagonists, Kraunus and Pletskaya will face.

Plot
Sbórnia is a small country that has always been isolated from the rest of the world, surrounded by a large wall that does not allow its contact with the neighbors. One day, however, an accident leads to the fall of the wall, and later the sbornians begin to discover the modern customs. Two local musicians, Kraunus and Pletskaya, observe the reactions of their countrymen: while some quickly adopt foreign culture, others prefer to reaffirm the sbornians traditions and resist imperialism.

Cast
 Hique Gomez
 Nico Nicolaiewsky
 Otto Guerra
 André Abujamra
 Arlete Salles
 Fernanda Takai

Music
The composer André Abujamra used the songs "Copérnico", "Desgrazzia ma non troppo", "Epitáfio" and "Aquarela da Sbórnia" from the play "Tangos e Tragédias", in which the film was based. Two other songs are part of the soundtrack: "Trevo de Quatro Folhas", by Nilo Sérgio, Mort Dixon, Harry Woods and "Rosa", by Pixinguinha and Otávio de Souza.

Accolades

References

External links
 
 
 

2013 animated films
2013 films
Brazilian animated films
Films set in a fictional country
Brazilian films based on plays
Films directed by Otto Guerra
2010s Portuguese-language films